Sepahan Airlines was an airline based in Isfahan, Iran.

History
The company has been an internal division of the manufacturer Iran Aircraft Manufacturing Industrial Company (HESA) and operated a fleet of 6 HESA-assembled Antonov An-140 turboprop aircraft. Following the 10 August 2014 crash, the entire IrAn-140 fleet in Iran was grounded, pending the outcome of the investigation, ultimately leading to the indefinite cessation of all Sepahan Airlines operations as it owned no other type of aircraft.

Fleet
The Sepahan Airlines fleet consisted of the following aircraft:

Accidents and incidents

On 10 August 2014, a HESA IrAn-140 operating flight SPN 5915 to Tabas crashed near Tehran Mehrabad International Airport, killing at least 39 passengers. The plane had taken off from the airport moments earlier at 9:45 hours local time (0515 UTC), before at least one of its engines failed.

References

Defunct airlines of Iran
Airlines established in 2010
Iranian companies established in 2010